John J. Cisco (April 26, 1806 - March 23, 1884), was a merchant in the dry goods business in New York City, who retired at the age of thirty-six with a fortune. Some eleven years later, in 1853 President Franklin Pierce appointed Cisco to the office of Assistant Treasurer of the United States, and placed in charge of the Sub-Treasury in New York. He was later also appointed to this office by President James Buchanan. After serving under two Democratic Presidents, Cisco expected to be replaced by the incoming Republican administration of President Lincoln, but was kept on. He served under Lincoln until the Spring of 1864, when Cisco resigned the post due to poor health. He had a City named after him ( Cisco, TX ) due to his enormous help in the construction of Dallas and Houston.

Family and residence 
He had four children and three marriages. He married Maria Devoo, Mary Anne Cregier and Eliza Porter Sandford. His children were: Maria Devo, Sarah Jane, John Ashfield, and Caroline Augusta. They lived in a house on Grymes Hill in Staten Island, New York erected in 1855 by Ernest Cazet, with grounds designed by Frederick Law Olmsted, the noted landscape architect.

Other activities 
After his retirement as Assistant Treasurer of the United States, at the insistence of President Lincoln, he was appointed government director and treasurer of the Union Pacific Railroad.

References 

1806 births
1884 deaths
People from Grymes Hill, Staten Island
19th-century American businesspeople
American merchants
United States Department of the Treasury officials
Pierce administration personnel
Buchanan administration personnel
Lincoln administration personnel